Cubot is a brand of Android smartphones manufactured in China by Shenzhen Huafurui Technology Co., Ltd. The company is based in Shenzhen and was founded in 2012.

Hardware
Cubot phones use the MediaTek system on a chip and the ARM architecture.

Provided without additional GUI to Android nor bloatwares pre-installed.

Smartphones series
 C, R, P: low-end market.
 KingKong, Quest: rugged smartphones.
 Note: wide screen.
 Power (formerly H): large battery.
 J, R, Rainbow, GT: very low-end market.
 P: below the X serie.
 S: ?
 X: Cubot's most expensive smartphones.

Models released
Previous and current models include:

2013 

T9
A890
A6589S
GT99
C10+
C9+
C9W
GT72
C7+
P9
C6
P5
GT90
Bobby
C11
One
P6

2014 

X6
S208
S222
S308
S108
P7
GT88
GT95
P10
S168
Zorro 001
S200
X9

2015 

S350
X10
X11
X12
X15
H1
P11
X16
X17
P12
S600
Note S

2016 

S550
S550 Pro
Z100
CheetahPhone
S500
H2
X17 S
Dinosaur
Rainbow
X16 S
Max
Echo
Z100 Pro
Manito
Cheetah 2

2017 

Rainbow 2
R9
Magic
Note Plus
X18
H3
King Kong

2018 

R11
X18 Plus
J3
J3 Pro
Nova
Power
P20
A5
King Kong 3

2019 

Quest
Quest Lite
X19
J5
R15
MAX 2
J7
X20
X20 Pro
P30
R15 Pro
R19
Note 20
KingKong Mini

2020 
● P40

● Note 7

● X30

2021 
Cubot X50
Cubot Note 20 pro

2022 
Pocket

Cheetah Phone 
In February 2016, Cubot and Cheetah Mobile launched the CheetahPhone, an Android 6.0 Marshmallow based smartphone, at MWC in Barcelona, Spain.

In 2016, Cubot and Kilimall launched the Cubot Note S, which includes an eight megapixel primary camera. The secondary camera is five megapixels. The 5.5" scratch resistant screen comes with an extra layer of security in the form of a protector. It has a high definition resolution of 720p. The device has a mono speaker and a 3.5mm jack. The device has 16 gigabytes of internal storage, expandable to 64 gigabytes.

References

External links
Cubot Mobile

Android (operating system) devices
Manufacturing companies based in Shenzhen
Mobile phone manufacturers
Chinese brands